Lawrence David (Larry) Brown (16 December 1940 – 21 February 2018) was Miers Busch Professor and Professor of Statistics at the Wharton School of the University of Pennsylvania in Philadelphia, Pennsylvania. He is known for his groundbreaking work in a broad range of fields including decision theory, recurrence and partial differential equations, nonparametric function estimation, minimax and adaptation theory, and the analysis of census data and call-center data.

Career 
Brown was educated at the California Institute of Technology and Cornell University, where he earned his Ph.D. in 1964.  He earned numerous honors, including election to the United States National Academy of Sciences, and published widely, beginning with his Ph.D. research, which made major advances in admissibility. He was president of the Institute of Mathematical Statistics in 1992–93. He was elected to the American Academy of Arts and Sciences in 2013.

After having been assistant professor at University of California at Berkeley, associate professor at Cornell Universitywith the latter move entailing a change from a statistics to a mathematics department, allowing him to avoid being drafted for the Vietnam Warand professor at Cornell University and Rutgers University, he was invited to join the Department of Statistics at the Wharton School of the University of Pennsylvania.

Personal life 
Brown was born in Los Angeles to parents Louis M. Brown and Hermione Brown. He was married to Linda Zhao, a fellow statistician at the Wharton School.

Honors and awards 

 Member, American Academy of Arts and Sciences
 Member, National Academy of Sciences
 Fellow of the American Statistical Association (A.S.A)
 Fellow of the Institute of Mathematical Statistics (I.M.S.)
 Wald Lecturer, Institute of Mathematical Statistics, August 1985;
Lady Davis Professorship, Hebrew University, 1988
Doctor of Science (Honorary), Purdue University, 1993
Wilks Award of the American Statistical Association, 2002
 C.R. and B. Rao Prize, 2007
 The Provost's Award for Distinguished Ph.D. Teaching and Mentoring, University of Pennsylvania, 2011

In his honor 

 Institute of Mathematical Statistics Lawrence D. Brown Ph.D. Student Award

Selected publications

Books 

 1985. (with Olkin, I., Sacks, J., and Wynn, H.P.) Jack Carl Kiefer Collected Papers, 3 vols., Springer-Verlag, New York.
 1986. (with Olkin, I., Sacks, J., and Wynn, H.P.) Jack Carl Kiefer Collected Papers Supplementary Volume, Springer-Verlag, New York.
 1986. Fundamentals of Statistical Exponential Families with Applications in Statistical Decision Theory, Inst. of Math. Statist., Hayward, California.
 2005. (with Plewes, T.J., and Gerstein, M.A.) Measuring Research and Development in the United States Economy, National Academies Press.
 2010. (with Michael L. Cohen, Daniel L. Cork, and Constance F. Citro) Envisioning the 2020 Census. Panel on the Design of the 2020 Census Program of Evaluations and Experiments, Committee on National Statistics, Division of Behavioral and Social Sciences and Education. Washington, DC: National Academies Press.

References

External links
 
 Faculty webpage
 Personal webpages
Biography of Lawrence D Brown
A Conversation with Lawrence D Brown
Lawrence Brown's ResearchGate Profile

1940 births
2018 deaths
People from Los Angeles
Cornell University faculty
Fellows of the American Statistical Association
American statisticians
Members of the United States National Academy of Sciences
Fellows of the American Academy of Arts and Sciences
Presidents of the Institute of Mathematical Statistics
Fellows of the Institute of Mathematical Statistics
Members of the National Academy of Medicine
Mathematical statisticians